In European polytheism, the Fates were supernatural beings who controlled the destiny of men and of the gods.

Fates may also refer to:

Farida Fatès (born 1962), French long-distance runner
Gil Fates (1914–2000), American television producer
Fates (album), released in 2006 by Erik Mongrain

See also
 Fate (disambiguation)
 Sisters of Fate (disambiguation)